The  is the girls-only Scouting organization serving Japan, founded in 1919. It became a member of the World Association of Girl Guides and Girl Scouts in 1952 and had 33,593 members .

History
Girl Guiding was first introduced in Japan in 1919 by Miss Muriel Greenstreet, a British missionary teacher. The movement gradually spread, and in 1920 took the name Joshi-Hodo-dan (Girl Guides of Japan). In 1928, Japan became a founder member of WAGGGS. Girl Guiding was banned by the government during World War II, restarted as Girl Scouting in 1947, and was officially recognized as Girl Scouts of Japan (Gārusukauto Nippon Renmei) in 1949.

In 2000, Her Highness Princess Sayako attended a variety of events in the Tokyo metropolitan area and in regional Japan, including the ceremony for the 50th anniversary of the establishment of the Girl Scouts of Tokyo, and the opening ceremony for the Togakushi Girl Scouts Center to commemorate the 80th anniversary of the Girl Scouting movement in Japan.

The Girl Scout program in Japan focuses on three major points: self-development, human relations, and nature. Some of the Girl Scout activities include working with the disabled, planting trees, and protecting the environment from floods and air pollution.

Program and ideals

The Girl Scouts are divided into 6 groups/ranks. Troops (団）tend to have multiple levels in one group that are further broken down into smaller units consisting of the same rank. Each group focuses on something new.

Tenderfoot (from 1 year before 1st grade), around 5 years old; a creme yellow neckerchief.
Brownie (grades 1 through 3), around 6 to 8 years; red neckerchief.

Brownies focus on learning more about themselves, their capabilities, and how much they matter. When a girl becomes a Brownie Scout, Leaders read the "Brownie Book" to the girls, sometimes even performing the story. It tells of two children who hear about magical creatures (Brownies) that help keep the house nice and clean. In order to help their parents the two children venture into the forest at night in search of the Brownies, only to discover at the end that they are Brownies and they can help their parents.

Junior (grades 4 through 6), around 9 to 11 years; brown neckerchief

Juniors begin to focus on their friend group and other scouts. The idea is to encourage girls to not think just about themselves, but of what they can do for and with their friends.

Senior (grades 7 through 9), around 12 to 14 years; green neckerchief
Rangers (grades 10 through 12), around 15 to 17 years; navy neckerchief
Adult Leaders (age 18 and over); light blue neckerchief

The Girl Scout emblem incorporates a sakura, a cherry blossom. May 22 is Girl Scout Day.

Promise

Law
 I am cheerful and courageous at all times.
 I respect all living things.
 I am a friend to all, and a sister to every Girl Scout.
 I am courteous.
 I use time and resources wisely.
 I think and act on my own.
 I am responsible for what I say and do.
 I try to be sincere.

See also
 Scout Association of Japan

Further reading 
 World Association of Girl Guides and Girl Scouts, World Bureau (2002), Trefoil Round the World. Eleventh Edition 1997.

References 

Scouting in Japan
World Association of Girl Guides and Girl Scouts member organizations
Youth organizations established in 1919
1919 establishments in Japan
Articles containing video clips